Stilifer quadrasi is a species of sea snail, a marine gastropod mollusk in the family Eulimidae. It is one of many species in Stilifer genus.

References

External links
 To World Register of Marine Species

Eulimidae
Gastropods described in 1893